Sharon Ellul-Bonici is a Maltese Eurosceptic politician.

Sharon Ellul-Bonici has been a member of the soft eurosceptic Maltese Labour Party. She tried to obtain her party's endorsement as a candidate for the 2004 European Parliament election, but was turned down for her hard eurosceptic links. Ellul-Bonici was at the time active in pan-European organisations such as No2EU and TEAM. The party's vigilance board feared that – once elected – she could join Europe of Democracies and Diversities rather than the PES group.

For the 2009 EU election she was fielded on the Labour Party list, but not elected to the European Parliament.

She has been the founding secretary-general of the European Alliance for Freedom, a eurosceptic pan-European party, established in late 2010, and led by former UKIP europarlamentarian Godfrey Bloom.

Sharon is married to Kevin Ellul Bonici.

References

Living people
Labour Party (Malta) politicians
21st-century Maltese women politicians
21st-century Maltese politicians
Year of birth missing (living people)